Governor Bernard may refer to:

Denis Bernard (British Army officer) (1882–1956), Governor of Bermuda from 1939 to 1941
Sir Francis Bernard, 1st Baronet (1712–1779), 10th Governor of the Province of New Jersey from 1758 to 1760 and Governor of the Province of Massachusetts Bay from 1760 to 1769